Erythranthe nasuta is a species of monkeyflower. It was formerly known as Mimulus nasutus.

Erythranthe  nasuta evolved from Erythranthe guttata in central California between 200,000 and 500,000 years ago and since then has become primarily a self-pollinator. Other differences have occurred since then, such as genetic code variations and variations in plant morphology. E. nasuta prefers a drier habitat than E. guttata.

References

nasuta